Poland competed at the 1996 Summer Olympics in Atlanta, United States. 165 competitors, 126 men and 39 women, took part in 126 events in 20 sports.

Medalists

Gold
 Robert Korzeniowski — Athletics, Men's 50 km Walk 
 Paweł Nastula — Judo, Men's Half-Heavyweight (95 kg)
 Renata Mauer — Shooting, Women's Air Rifle
 Włodzimierz Zawadzki — Wrestling, Men's Greco-Roman Featherweight (62 kg)
 Ryszard Wolny — Wrestling, Men's Lightweight (68 kg)
 Andrzej Wroński — Wrestling, Men's Greco-Roman Heavyweight (100 kg)
 Mateusz Kusznierewicz — Sailing, Men's Finn Individual Competition

Silver
 Artur Partyka — Athletics, Men's High Jump 
 Aneta Szczepanska — Judo, Women's Middleweight (66 kg)
 Piotr Kiełpikowski, Adam Krzesiński, and Ryszard Sobczak — Fencing, Men's Foil Team Competition
 Mirosław Rzepkowski — Shooting, Men's Skeet
 Jacek Fafiński — Wrestling, Men's Greco-Roman Light Heavyweight (90 kg)

Bronze
 Joanna Nowicka, Katarzyna Klata, and Iwona Dzięcioł — Archery, Women's Team Competition
 Piotr Markiewicz — Canoeing, Men's K1 500 m Kayak Singles
 Renata Mauer — Shooting, Women's Small-bore Rifle, Three Positions 
 Andrzej Cofalik — Weightlifting, Men's Light Heavyweight (83 kg) 
 Józef Tracz — Wrestling, Men's Greco-Roman Welterweight (74 kg)

Archery

Poland entered three women and one man in its sixth appearance in Olympic archery.  Veteran Joanna Nowicka had the best result of the individual round, while the women's team won the bronze medal.

Athletics

Men
Track & road events

Field events

Combined events – Decathlon

Women
Track & road events

Field events

Combined events – Heptathlon

Badminton

Boxing

Men

Canoeing

Slalom

Sprint
Men

Women

Qualification Legend: 'R = Qualify to repechage; QS = Qualify to semi-final; QF = Qualify directly to final

Cycling

Road

Track
1000m time trial

Individual Pursuit

Mountain biking

Equestrianism

Eventing

Fencing

Eleven fencers, seven men and four women, represented Poland in 1996.

Men

Women

Gymnastics

Rhythmic gymnastics

Judo

Men

Women

Modern pentathlon

Rhythmic gymnastics

Rowing

Men

Sailing

Men

Women

M = Medal race; EL = Eliminated – did not advance into the medal race; CAN = Race cancelled

Shooting

Men

Women

Swimming

Men

Women

Table tennis

Singles

Doubles

Tennis

Women

Volleyball

Men's Indoor Team Competition

Pool A

|}

|}

Team Roster
Damian Dacewicz
Piotr Gruszka 
Krzysztof Jańczak
Marcin Nowak 
Robert Prygiel 
Witold Roman (captain)
Krzysztof Śmigiel 
Andrzej Stelmach 
Krzysztof Stelmach 
Mariusz Szyszko 
Leszek Urbanowicz
Paweł Zagumny

Weightlifting

Men

Wrestling

Men's freestyle

Men's Greco-Roman

Notes

References

Nations at the 1996 Summer Olympics
1996
1996 in Polish sport